Rammstein: Paris is the fourth live video and third live album by German Neue Deutsche Härte band Rammstein. It was released on 19 May 2017. For the film, the concerts on 6 and 7 March 2012 were filmed entirely. The scenes were cut with scenes recorded during rehearsals for the tour. Every show was filmed with 30 cameras in front of 17,000 people each night in Paris. The film was to be shown on 24, 26 and 30 November 2016, but the information leaked and several cinemas put up adverts too early, thus the release was postponed to 23, 24 and 29 March 2017.

Before its theatrical release the film was shown three times: at the Cannes Film Festival (11 May 2016), CinemaxX cinema Cologne (11 August 2016) and at the Avant Première Film Festival Berlin (14 February 2017). On its first day of release, the film made more money in the cinemas than Beauty and the Beast on its first day. The movie had its official world premiere on 16 March 2017 at the Volksbühne in Berlin. All members of the band were present, as well as Jonas Åkerlund.

Reception
Rammstein: Paris was nominated at the UK Music Video Awards 2017, where it won in the Best Live Concert category. The audio is mixed in Dolby Atmos, with an additional soundtrack being LPCM stereo (48 kHz/24-bit).

Track listing

Rammstein: Paris was released in the following formats:
 Digital: download and audio streaming
 Audio CD: 2 CDs
 Standard edition: 1 DVD or 1 Blu-ray (6 panel digipak)
 Special edition: 1 DVD or 1 Blu-ray, 2 CDs (8 panel digipak)
 Limited "metal" fan edition: 1 Blu-ray, 2 CDs (laser-cut metal plate cover artwork, 8 panel digipak)
 Deluxe box edition: 4 LPs (blue), 1 Blu-ray, 2 CDs (black cardboard box)

Personnel
Rammstein:
Till Lindemann – lead vocals
Richard Kruspe – lead guitar, backing vocals
Oliver Riedel – bass guitar
Paul Landers – rhythm guitar, backing vocals
Christian Lorenz – keyboards
Christoph Schneider – drums
Jonas Åkerlund – director

Charts

Weekly charts

Year-end charts

Certifications

References

2017 video albums
2017 live albums
Rammstein albums
Universal Records live albums
German-language live albums
Live video albums
Films directed by Jonas Åkerlund